Glenn David Whelan (born 13 January 1984) is an Irish professional footballer who plays as a defensive midfielder for Bristol Rovers. He has represented the 
Republic of Ireland national football team.

Whelan started his career at Manchester City but only made one appearance which came in the UEFA Cup and after a loan spell at Bury he moved on to play for Sheffield Wednesday, with whom he won promotion to the Championship in May 2005. In January 2008 Whelan joined Stoke City for a fee of £500,000 with whom he helped gain promotion to the Premier League. He took a while to establish himself in Tony Pulis' first team plans in the top flight but by 2009 he became a regular and went on to play in the 2011 FA Cup Final, but his old club Manchester City beat Stoke 1–0. Whelan continued to be a regular in the side under Pulis and kept his place under Mark Hughes. Whelan spent nine years at Stoke making 338 appearances before joining Aston Villa in July 2017 and then Hearts in August 2019.

Early life
Whelan was born in Dublin. He grew up in Palmerstown and attended St. Lorcan's Boys' National School.

Club career

Manchester City
Whelan started his career with Manchester City joining from Irish feeder club Cherry Orchard in 2001. He made a solitary appearance in the UEFA Cup coming on as a substitute for Paul Bosvelt against Total Network Solutions in August 2003, before joining Bury on a one-month loan the following month. After appearing in the Republic of Ireland's 2003 FIFA World Youth Championship campaign in November and December, he returned to Bury on another one-month loan on 24 December 2003. In total Whelan played 15 times on loan at Bury and caught the attentions of Sheffield Wednesday manager Chris Turner.

Sheffield Wednesday
Whelan joined Sheffield Wednesday on a free transfer in the summer of 2004. He made his debut for Wednesday against Huddersfield Town on 21 August and in his next match, a League Cup tie against Walsall, he provided Lee Peacock with an assist and earned the praise from his manager. He scored his first goal for Wednesday in a 1–1 draw against Walsall in the league. His promising start to his Wednesday career took a knock as he was sent off in a League Cup tie against Coventry City for "violent conduct". However, caretaker manager Mark Smith criticised the referee's decision. Under new manager Paul Sturrock the team managed to finish in 5th position in 2004–05 claiming a play-off place where they defeated Brentford to reach the final. Whelan was voted "man of the match" in the League One play-off final against Hartlepool United at the Millennium Stadium in Cardiff after scoring the match-winning third goal for Wednesday.

After Wednesday won promotion to the Championship, Whelan was trialled as captain by Paul Sturrock after regular captain Lee Bullen was injured. Wednesday were able to avoid an instant return to the third tier in 2005–06 as they finished in 19th position, Whelan playing in 46 matches that season scoring once, which came in a 2–1 defeat against Watford.

In July 2006, Whelan was placed on the transfer list by Sturrock following increased competition for places in the Wednesday midfield after the arrival of Wade Small, Kenny Lunt and Yoann Folly. He was subsequently removed from the transfer list by the following manager, Brian Laws. Whelan repaid the faith shown in him with seven goals. He then went on to win a number of player of the year awards for the club's 2006–07 season. His performances led to manager Laws entering into contract negotiations with Whelan. Sheffield Wednesday rejected bids for Whelan from both Burnley and Plymouth Argyle in January 2008. However, a £500,000 bid from Stoke City was accepted on transfer deadline day.

Stoke City
Whelan joined Stoke City on 30 January 2008 for £500,000 signing a three and a half-year contract. He made his first Stoke City appearance in a Championship match against Cardiff City on 2 February 2008 when he came on as a substitute in the 82nd minute for Mamady Sidibé. Whelan made his first Stoke City league start the following match in a 4–2 victory against Wolverhampton Wanderers. He scored his first goal for Stoke in a 2–1 home defeat to Crystal Palace on 7 April 2008. Whelan played 14 times for Stoke City in the 2007–08 season as Stoke finished 2nd and were promoted to the Premier League.

Whelan started the club's first match in the Premier League against Bolton Wanderers. Whelan did not have a good match and as a result he did not feature much in the first team, only playing in League Cup fixtures and even reserve matches. Despite this setback, Whelan was still a regular in the Irish national team. In December 2008 Whelan was being linked with a move away from the Britannia Stadium but he revealed that he wanted to stay. Whelan did manage to force his way back into the first team and he became an important player in Stoke's successful fight for survival.
Whelan scored a last minute equaliser away against Aston Villa on 1 March. Whelan signed a new four-year contract with Stoke on 15 September 2009. He scored his first goal of the 2009–10 season against Tottenham Hotspur which earned Stoke a 1–0 victory. He also went on to score against Manchester City in a 1–1 draw with Whelan beating fellow Irish international Shay Given. Arsenal player Aaron Ramsey praised Whelan for his support after Ramsey's suffered a leg break in a match between Stoke and Arsenal.

He made his 100th appearance for Stoke in a 2–0 win over Everton on 1 January 2011. After drifting in and out the starting eleven for most of the 2010–11 season Whelan made a return in March and played a key role in Stoke's run to their first FA Cup Final. Whelan reached a century of league appearances for the club on 8 May 2011 against Arsenal. Whelan played in the 2011 FA Cup Final as Stoke lost 1–0 to his old club Manchester City.

Whelan scored a rare goal for Stoke against FC Thun in the UEFA Europa League in August 2011. In a match against Bolton Wanderers referee Howard Webb awarded an indirect free-kick inside the penalty area for a back-pass against Whelan after two minutes. Kevin Davies scored from the quickly-taken restart to put Bolton ahead. Stoke chairman Peter Coates criticised Webb's controversial decision to penalise Whelan. He scored his first league goal for more than 18 months against Blackburn Rovers in November 2011. In January 2012, manager Tony Pulis confirmed that he wanted Whelan to sign a new contract stating "Every time you ask Glenn to step up to that next level, he does it. He's a good lad, very single-minded. He's got that Celtic blood in him and the determination to prove people wrong – including myself at times". Whelan signed a new three-and-a-half-year contract on 11 January 2012 and said "I am loving life at the moment and things are going really well, so I am absolutely delighted to commit my long-term future to the club".

In March 2012, Whelan made his 37th international appearance for the Republic of Ireland, with all of his caps coming whilst at Stoke he surpassed Gordon Banks' record becoming Stoke's most capped player. In the summer of 2012, Stoke signed midfielders Charlie Adam and Steven Nzonzi and Whelan's place in the side came under threat but he 'lifted his game' and retained his place for 2012–13 season. He avoided a ban after a 'two footed' tacked on Manchester City's Javi García in the FA Cup. Whelan played 34 times in 2012–13 as Stoke finished in 13th position. He ended the season on a sour note as he was involved in a dressing room bust-up with Kenwyne Jones.

At the end of the 2012–13 season Tony Pulis was replaced by Mark Hughes and Whelan stated that he hopes the change in style of play will help the team score more goals. Whelan initially had to fight for his place under Hughes at the start of the 2013–14 season but he soon became a regular in the side again. Whelan became a vital member of the team under Hughes and he made 36 appearances as Stoke finished in 9th position. Whelan described the 2013–14 season as his best for the club.

Whelan retained his place in the side at the start of the 2014–15 season before he was ruled out of six weeks suffered a fractured leg whilst on international duty with Ireland in October 2014. He returned to the side in December 2014 after successfully recovering from his injury. Whelan signed a two-year contract extension in January 2015. In February 2015, Following an injury to captain Ryan Shawcross, Whelan acted as stand-in captain and after a woeful 4–1 defeat against Blackburn Rovers in the FA Cup Whelan had a dressing room rant at his teammates. Whelan played 30 times for Stoke in 2014–15 as the Potters finished in 9th position for a second season running and they ended the campaign with a 6–1 victory against Liverpool. His performances during the campaign earn him the praise of teammates Adam and Shawcross who both described Whelan as the teams 'unsung-hero'.

Whelan was again a key figure under Hughes in 2015–16, making 42 appearances as Stoke again finished in 9th position. He also filled in as stand-in captain during the season due to injury to Ryan Shawcross. He made his 300th appearance for Stoke on 12 March 2016 against Southampton, however he was not to be on the winning team as Stoke lost 2–1 at home. At the end of the campaign, Whelan admitted that he was disappointed that the team did not finish higher in the table.

Prior to the start of the 2016–17 season, Whelan signed a one-year contract extension in July 2016, which ties him to Stoke until the summer of 2018. Whelan played 31 times in 2016–17, as Stoke finished in 13th position. Whelan gave an honest assessment of Stoke's campaign following a 2–2 away at AFC Bournemouth on 6 May 2017. "We're disappointed, being twice up away from home especially to a team like Bournemouth and giving away two sloppy goals pretty much sums up our season I think".

Aston Villa
Whelan joined Aston Villa on 20 July 2017 on a two-year contract for a fee of £1 million. He scored his first goal for Aston Villa in a 4–2 win at Sheffield Wednesday on 24 February 2018. Whelan played 35 times in 2017–18 helping Villa reach the 2018 EFL Championship play-off final where they lost 1–0 to Fulham. He made 38 appearances in 2018–19 as Villa again managed to reach the play-off final this time beating Derby County 2–1. At the end of the campaign Whelan's contract was not renewed by Dean Smith.

Heart of Midlothian
On 14 August 2019, Whelan joined Scottish Premiership side Heart of Midlothian on a one-year contract. He left the club in January 2020, after new manager Daniel Stendel had dropped him from the team. Whelan subsequently criticised Hearts, saying that he felt like he had been "thrown under a bus" by the club and described the way they handled his departure as "amateurish". Conversely, it was later revealed that Whelan had made little or no effort to become involved in the club, and - in the words of journalist Tom English - 'club, players and fans alike were unconvinced by the level of commitment the Ireland international showed towards the club ... [and] not one person is sorry to see him go. Not one.

Fleetwood Town
Whelan signed a short-term deal with League One club Fleetwood Town on 24 January 2020, joining until the end of the season.

Bristol Rovers
On 4 September 2021, Whelan joined recently relegated League Two club Bristol Rovers on a one-year deal, linking up with former Fleetwood manager Joey Barton having trained with the club for part of pre-season. On 11 September 2021, Whelan made his debut for the club playing the entirety of a 1–0 away defeat at Hartlepool United. On 13 November 2021, Whelan was sent off after receiving two bookings as Rovers held on to beat Northampton Town, a first sending-off since 2013. The season ended with Whelan securing a fourth career promotion, a 7–0 victory on the final day of the season moving Rovers into the final automatic promotion place, overtaking Northampton Town on goals scored having finished on the same points with the same goal difference. This proved to be his last match for the club as he left the club on a free transfer at the end of the season.

On 29 July 2022, Whelan returned to the club in the role of first-team coach whilst also being registered as a player if he were to be required.

International career
In October 2000, Whelan played for the Republic of Ireland under-16 national team in a qualifying tournament in Riga for the 2001 UEFA European Under-16 Championship where he came up against Andrés Iniesta. He represented the Republic of Ireland Under-20 team at the 2003 FIFA World Youth Championship and has been capped 19 times by the Republic of Ireland national under-21 football team, captaining the side on many of these occasions.

His first cap for the Republic of Ireland national B team came on 20 November 2007 against Scotland. Whelan made his debut for the senior team against Serbia in May 2008 and scored his first international goal against Georgia in Mainz, Germany on 6 September 2008. Since the appointment of Giovanni Trapattoni, Whelan became a key member of the squad and made 11 straight appearances despite previously being considered an "also-ran".
He scored his second goal for Ireland against Italy with a spectacular strike from almost 25 yards on 10 October 2009 in a 2–2 draw.
Whelan started the matches in both legs against France as Ireland were controversially knocked out 2–1 on aggregate after extra-time.

Whelan again was ever present in Ireland's midfield for the UEFA Euro 2012 qualifying and he was also part of the team that secured qualification for UEFA Euro 2012 with an unprecedented 5–1 aggregate play-off win over Estonia. He was named in Trapattoni's 23-man squad for UEFA Euro 2012 in Poland and Ukraine. Ireland had a poor campaign and were eliminated after losing all three of their Group C fixtures.

Whelan won his 50th Irish cap on 14 August 2013 against Wales. He was branded a "terrible" player by RTÉ pundit and former Republic of Ireland international Eamon Dunphy in the aftermath of a poor performance in a 2014 FIFA World Cup qualifying match against Sweden. Whelan hit back at Dunphy stating that he is nothing more than a "media bully".

Represented the national team at 2016 Euro, where they lost to France in round of 16.

Whelan earned his 90th cap against Switzerland in October 2019 making him the ninth most capped Irish player of all time.

Coaching Career
In October 2022, Whelan was a part of the Republic of Ireland Under-16s coaching team at the Victory Shield competition.

Personal life
Whelan grew up in Dublin as a Liverpool supporter; however, he cites Paul McGrath as his hero. Whilst living in Dublin, Whelan attended matches at League of Ireland side St Patrick's Athletic and cites Paul Osam as his favourite St Pat's player, stating Osam was the player that inspired him to play football. Whelan is married to Karren, with whom he has a daughter, Abbie and a son Jack. The couple live in Wilmslow, Cheshire.

In January 2022, Whelan avoided a driving ban due to mitigating circumstances of needing to be able to drive to and from matches.

Career statistics

Club

International

Scores and results list Republic of Ireland's goal tally first, score column indicates score after each Whelan goal.

Honours
Sheffield Wednesday
Football League One play-offs: 2005

Stoke City
Football League Championship runner-up: 2007–08
FA Cup runner-up: 2010–11

Aston Villa
EFL Championship play-offs: 2019

Bristol Rovers
EFL League Two third-place promotion: 2021–22

Republic of Ireland
Nations Cup: 2011

Individual
Sheffield Wednesday Player of the Year: 2007
FAI Under 21 International Player of the Year: 2004

References

External links

Profile at the Aston Villa F.C. website

1984 births
Living people
Association footballers from Dublin (city)
Republic of Ireland association footballers
Republic of Ireland under-21 international footballers
Republic of Ireland youth international footballers
Republic of Ireland B international footballers
Republic of Ireland international footballers
Association football midfielders
Cherry Orchard F.C. players
Manchester City F.C. players
Bury F.C. players
Sheffield Wednesday F.C. players
Stoke City F.C. players
Aston Villa F.C. players
Heart of Midlothian F.C. players
Fleetwood Town F.C. players
Wythenshawe Amateurs F.C. players
Bristol Rovers F.C. players
Premier League players
English Football League players
Scottish Professional Football League players
North West Counties Football League players
UEFA Euro 2012 players
UEFA Euro 2016 players
Republic of Ireland expatriate association footballers
Expatriate footballers in England
Irish expatriate sportspeople in England
Expatriate footballers in Scotland
Irish expatriate sportspeople in Scotland
FA Cup Final players
Bristol Rovers F.C. non-playing staff